Căbăiești is a village in Călărași District, Moldova.

References

Villages of Călărași District